The squonk is a mythical creature that is reputed to live in the hemlock forests of northern Pennsylvania in the United States.

Origins
Although the earliest written account of the squonk was from the 1910 book Fearsome Creatures of the Lumberwoods, there are no records of the tale being told in Pennsylvania before the book's publication. The next written iteration, from the 1939 book Fearsome Critters, suggested that the creatures had migrated from deserts to swamps to finally settle in Pennsylvania. As logging camps were continuously moving in the early 20th century, this could explain the "creature's" migration to Pennsylvania.

Appearance and behavior
Unlike many mythological creatures, the supposed physical characteristics of the squonk remain unchanged from the original written account, which states:

Later retellings included that squonks were slowest on moonlit nights as they try to avoid seeing its ugly appearance in any illuminated bodies of water. In addition to warts and moles, the creatures were given webbed toes on their left feet.

The given "species" taxonomy of the creature, Lacrimacorpus dissolvens, is made up of the Latin tear, body, and dissolve. These refer to its supposed ability to dissolve when captured.

In scientific literature
Some substances are stable in solution or some other "wild" form but cannot be isolated or captured without actually catalyzing their own polymerization or decomposition ("dissolving in their own tears"). For example, a molecule containing a carboxylic acid moiety and an acid labile moiety might be stable when initially prepared as the salt (e.g., barium prephenate) but unstable as the free acid (prephenic acid). These have been named "chemical squonks".

References

Fakelore
Fearsome critters
Pennsylvania folklore